Scott Martin (born December 28, 1971) is a Republican politician from the U.S. state of Oklahoma. He served in the Oklahoma House of Representatives as chair of the Appropriations and Budget Committee and the representative for House District 46.

Martin was elected to the Oklahoma House of Representatives in November 2006. He resigned in May 2017 to lead the Norman Chamber of Commerce.

Early life and career

Born in Tulsa, Oklahoma, Scott Martin graduated from Tulsa Memorial High School in 1991 and earned a bachelor's degree in political science from the University of Oklahoma in 1995.

He married Angela on May 22, 2004.

He has worked as a public employee for the cities of Norman, Oklahoma and Noble, Oklahoma.

Political career

Scott Martin was elected to the Oklahoma House of Representatives in 2005. In his 2008 re-election bid, he said he supported the proper use of all road user fees for road maintenance, limited state government and reductions to the state income tax rate.

Oklahoma House Speaker T.W. Shannon announced the appointment of the Norman Republican as chair of the Appropriations and Budget Committee in 2012.

A Norman Transcript editorial called Scott Martin "a reasonable, visionary lawmaker who understands the state's strengths and priorities and the funding requirements needed to get there."

References

Living people
Republican Party members of the Oklahoma House of Representatives
Politicians from Tulsa, Oklahoma
People from Norman, Oklahoma
Businesspeople from Oklahoma
1971 births
21st-century American politicians